Pontonia is a genus of shrimps belonging to the family Palaemonidae.

The genus has almost cosmopolitan distribution.

Species:

Pontonia chimaera 
Pontonia domestica 
Pontonia longispina 
Pontonia maculata 
Pontonia manningi 
Pontonia margarita 
Pontonia mexicana 
Pontonia panamica 
Pontonia pilosa 
Pontonia pinnae 
Pontonia pinnophylax 
Pontonia simplex 
Pontonia unidens

References

Palaemonidae